Belyashevo (Beläş) is a rural locality (a selo) in Badryashevsky Selsoviet, Tatyshlinsky District, Bashkortostan, Russia. The population was 469 as of 2010. There are 7 streets.

Geography 
Belyashevo is located 16 km north of Verkhniye Tatyshly (the district's administrative centre) by road. Badryashevo is the nearest rural locality.

References 

Rural localities in Tatyshlinsky District